The First Wirth cabinet (German: Erstes Kabinett Wirth) was the fifth democratically elected Reichsregierung of the German Reich. It was named after Reichskanzler (chancellor) Joseph Wirth and took office on 10 May 1921 when it replaced the Fehrenbach cabinet.

The cabinet was once again based on the "Weimar Coalition" of Social Democratic Party of Germany (SPD), the Catholic Zentrum and the German Democratic Party (DDP). Fehrenbach's cabinet had been based on the Zentrum, DDP and the German People's Party (DVP).

The First Wirth cabinet resigned on 22 October 1921 in protest over the handling of the Upper Silesia plebiscite by the League of Nations. It was replaced on 26 October by another cabinet led by Wirth.

Establishment and Londoner Ultimatum
Wirth had been Finance Minister under chancellor Fehrenbach, whose cabinet had resigned on the evening of 4 May 1921 over its inability to agree on a new proposal to present to the Allies on the question of war reparations. On 5 May, the Allies then issued what became known as the "London Ultimatum". It demanded that by 11 May the German government accept the war reparations schedule and its total sum, punctually comply with disarmament according to the Treaty of Versailles and initiate trials of German war criminals. In the case of non-compliance, the Allies would occupy the whole Ruhr, Germany's industrial heartland. This would be in addition to measures already announced: occupation of Düsseldorf, Duisburg and Ruhrort as well as financial sanctions in the form of a levy on German exports.

It took the German parties until 10 May to decide on their positions towards this ultimatum. The independent social democrats (USPD), SPD and Zentrum favoured acceptance. The DDP was split and left the decision to its Reichstag delegates. Attempts by the SPD to win the USPD for a coalition failed because the latter refused to cooperate with the Zentrum. The Zentrum, readier than the SPD to accept the stipulations of the ultimatum, now tried to form a government including both the DVP and the SPD. However, the DVP had voted against the ultimatum and a consensus proved impossible. Among those discussed as possible chancellors were Gustav Bauer and Paul Löbe (both SPD), Konrad Adenauer and Joseph Wirth (both Zentrum).

On the evening of 10 May, Wirth was able to present his new (if incomplete) cabinet. The Foreign Ministry, the Ministry of Finance and the Ministry for Reconstruction were still vacant with the former two temporarily led by Wirth. Wirth issued a government statement, endorsing acceptance of the ultimatum. The Reichstag voted 220 to 172 (one abstention) for the ultimatum. In the night of 10/11 May, a note stating acceptance signed by Wirth went out to the German embassies at London, Paris, Rome, Bruxelles and Tokyo.

The government was based on parties that did not have a majority in the Reichstag (only 206 of 459 delegates were members of the Zentrum, SPD or DDP). However, a policy of compliance with Allied demands found the support of the USPD on the left. On the right, some DVP delegates had indeed voted to accept the ultimatum, signalling some support from this quarter, too.

Overview of the members
The members of the cabinet were as follows:

Notes: Wirth served as his own Minister of Finance. He was also temporary Foreign Minister until 23 May 1921 when Rosen took over at the Auswärtiges Amt. The position of Reichsminister für Wiederaufbau was vacant until the end of May, when after a long period of hesitation, Rathenau accepted the position.

Resignation
On 22 October 1921, the First Wirth cabinet resigned in protest over the decision by the Allies and the League of Nations to ignore the results of the Upper Silesia plebiscite – in which around 60% of voters had favoured remaining part of the Germany – by partitioning Upper Silesia and awarding about a third of the territory, half of the population and around 80% of the region's heavy industry to Poland. On 25 October, president Friedrich Ebert asked Wirth to form a new government, this time without the DDP. The first Wirth cabinet was thus succeeded on 26 October 1921 by the second Wirth cabinet.

References

Wirth I
Wirth I
1921 establishments in Germany
Cabinets established in 1921
Cabinets disestablished in 1921